Sulayman "Sal" Jobarteh (born 9 March 1993) is a  professional footballer who plays as a midfielder for IFK Haninge. Born in Sweden, Jobarteh represents the Gambia national football team.

International career
Jobarteh was born in Sweden and is of Gambian descent. He debuted for the Gambia national football team in a 1-0 friendly win over Guinea on 7 June 2019.

Personal life
Jobarteh is the brother of the professional footballer Alagie Sosseh.

References

External links
 
 Fotboll Transfers Profile
 
 

1993 births
Living people
People from Huddinge Municipality
People with acquired Gambian citizenship
Gambian footballers
The Gambia international footballers
Swedish footballers
Gambian expatriate footballers
Swedish expatriate footballers
Sweden youth international footballers
Swedish people of Gambian descent
AFC Eskilstuna players
IF Brommapojkarna players
Dalkurd FF players
AIK Fotboll players
IK Sirius players
Moss FK players
CD San Roque de Lepe footballers
Nyköpings BIS players
Assyriska FF players
Fredrikstad FK players
Superettan players
Ettan Fotboll players
Norwegian First Division players
Norwegian Second Division players
Tercera División players
Association football midfielders
Swedish expatriate sportspeople in Norway
Swedish expatriate sportspeople in Spain
Expatriate footballers in Norway
Expatriate footballers in Spain
Sportspeople from Stockholm County